Kora Kagaz (Blank Paper) is an Indian TV series which ran on Star Plus from 27 October 1998 until 17 January 2002. It was directed by Asha Parekh. The series had 169 episodes which starred Renuka Shahane, Salil Ankola and Amit Behl.The serial was first telecasted on every Tuesday at 8.30 pm IST and later shifting to every Thursday at 9 pm IST.

Synopsis
The wedding of Mahesh and Pooja is held with all the pomp and tradition associated with Indian weddings. The night after the wedding, Pooja, a nervous bride, waits for her husband to join her. He comes very late, and when he does, it is to tell her that he is in love with another girl. He tells Pooja bluntly that he never wanted to marry her in the first place and walks out, leaving behind a distraught and confused young bride trying to come to grips with this new reality.

Pooja refuses to return to her parents. She continues to reside with Mahesh's family, consisting of his parents and younger brother Ravi. She decides to continue her studies, find a job and get her life back together again. All members of Mahesh's family are supportive and well-disposed towards Pooja. They were unaware of his affair with the other girl. In particular, Pooja gets tremendous moral and emotional support from her brother-in-law Ravi, and an attraction forming between them becomes evident as the serial progresses. Where will this attraction lead them, and what does Pooja do when Mahesh suddenly arrives back into her life?

What does Pooja do? What choices does she make? Will she find fulfillment?

Cast

 Renuka Shahane as Pooja
Salil Ankola as Ravi
Amit Behl as Mahesh
Anil Dhawan as The father of Ravi and Mahesh
Uttara Baokar as The mother of Ravi and Mahesh
Smita Bansal as Priya
Arpita Pandey / Shweta Gautam as Yogita
Grusha Kapoor as Shalini
Ashalata as Pooja's mother
S. M. Zaheer as Pooja's father
Kamlesh as Anil
Sonam Malhotra as Naseem
Iira Soni as Varsha
Dhawal Barbhaya/Jagdeep as Varsha's father
Dilip Joshi as Varsha's brother
Rakesh Thareja as Anand
Vishwanath/Ashfaq Khan as Pooja's brother
Anuj Saxena as Dr. Deepak
Nagendra as Advocate
Sudhir Mitoo
Gauri Tonk
Sunita Rajwan
Imran Mallick
Chand Dhar as Anand's father
Archana as Priya's friend
Meena Nathani as Pooja's college principal
Ishtiaque Khan as Shami's father
Kanika Shivpuri as Shami's mother
Soumya Arya as Shadab
Shri Vallabh Vyas as Monk
Arfan Khan as Irfan
Vikrant as Salim
 Lata Haya as Naseem's Aunty 
 Madhavi Gogate as Anand's Mother 
 Eva Grover as Sneha
Dev as Mr. Kriplani
 Prashant as Pooja's cousin
 Inder Kohli as Ravi's friend
 Rakesh Chouhan as Ravi's friend
 Dinkar Verma as Inder's friend
 Dinesh Hakku as Ravi's Boss
 Anita Pawal as Shalini's Mother

References

External links
 http://www.starindiacontent.com/shows.asp?programid=62
 https://archive.today/20130203055337/http://tvshows.sulekha.com/kora-kagaz_on_star-utsav-tv_home.htm

StarPlus original programming
1998 Indian television series debuts
1999 Indian television series endings
Indian drama television series